IC 1913 is a barred spiral galaxy in the constellation Fornax. It belongs to the Fornax Cluster, which contains approximately 200 galaxies.

It is 66.5 million light years distant from Earth, and based on its size on the night sky and distance, it is 37,000 light years in diameter. It was discovered by DeLisle Stewart in 1899.

It is visible from southern hemisphere using telescope, but not with a naked eye.

See also 
IC 1919
NGC 1399
NGC 1427A

References 

Barred spiral galaxies
Fornax Cluster
Fornax (constellation)